Stephen Carl Evans (born December 17, 1963) is a retired rear admiral in the United States Navy, who commanded Carrier Strike Group 2.

Naval career
Additionally, he was Commodore of Destroyer Squadron 50.

Duties ashore for Evans have include assignments with the Operational Test and Evaluation Force and Joint Warfare Analysis Center, as well as serving as Chairman of the Admissions Board of the United States Naval Academy, Senior Military Assistant to the United States Secretary of the Navy, and Commander of Naval Service Training Command.

Evans' awards include the Legion of Merit, the Defense Meritorious Service Medal, the Meritorious Service Medal, the Navy and Marine Corps Commendation Medal, the Joint Service Achievement Medal and the Navy and Marine Corps Achievement Medal.

Education

The Citadel, The Military College of South Carolina
Naval War College
Massachusetts Institute of Technology

References

People from Beaufort, South Carolina
United States Navy rear admirals (lower half)
Recipients of the Legion of Merit
The Citadel, The Military College of South Carolina alumni
Naval War College alumni
Massachusetts Institute of Technology alumni
Living people
Place of birth missing (living people)
1963 births